Romulus Gabor (born 14 October 1961) is a Romanian former professional footballer who played as a forward.

Club career
Romulus Gabor was born on 14 October 1961 in Pui, Hunedoara County. He started playing football at age 13 at Jiul Petroșani, where he stayed for a short while before moving at Corvinul Hunedoara where on 28 October 1978 he made his Divizia A debut under coach Ilie Savu in a 2–0 loss against Argeș Pitești. At the end of his first season spent at Corvinul, the club relegated to Divizia B, but Gabor stayed with the club, being used more often after coach Mircea Lucescu came to the club, promoting back to the first division after one year, helping the club finish 3rd in the 1981–82 Divizia A, also appearing in four games in which he scored one goal in the 1982–83 UEFA Cup. After 13 seasons spent with Corvinul Hunedoara in which he scored 68 goals in 305 league games, in 1991 he was transferred at Nemzeti Bajnokság I club, Diósgyőri VTK. After one season spent in Hungary, Gabor returned to play for Corvinul in Divizia B, afterwards going for a half of season to play for Universitatea Cluj where he made his last Divizia A appearance on 10 November 1993 in a 3–2 victory against Gloria Bistrița. Afterwards he played for Unirea Alba Iulia, Corvinul Hunedoara and Inter Sibiu in Divizia B, ending his carer in 1997 at Divizia C club, Viitorul Oradea. Romulus Gabor has a total of 304 Divizia A appearances with 64 goals scored and 13 Nemzeti Bajnokság I matches played with one goal scored.

International career
Romulus Gabor played 35 games and scored 2 goals for Romania, all under the guidance of coach Mircea Lucescu, being nicknamed "Lucescu's child", making his debut on 11 November 1981 in a 0–0 against Switzerland at the 1982 World Cup qualifiers. He played 6 games at the successful Euro 1984 qualifiers. He was used by coach Mircea Lucescu in two games at the Euro 1984 final tournament, in the first one which was a 1–1 against Spain he played as a starter until the 76th minute when he was replaced by Gheorghe Hagi and in the second one he came as a substitute and replaced Mircea Irimescu in the 59th minute of a 1–0 loss against Portugal as Romania did not pass the group stage. He scored his first goal for the national team from a free kick in a friendly against Turkey. Romulus Gabor played two games at the 1986 World Cup qualifiers, scored his second goal in a friendly against Egypt and made his last appearance on 23 April 1986 in a friendly which ended with a 2–1 victory against Soviet Union. Gabor was also part of Romania's U20 squad at the 1981 World Youth Championship from Australia, appearing in 6 games in which he scored two goals, helping the team finish the tournament in the 3rd position, winning the bronze medal, also winning the Golden Ball award for the best player of the tournament and the Bronze shoe for the third goalscorer of the competition. 

For representing his country at Euro 1984, Gabor was decorated by President of Romania Traian Băsescu on 25 March 2008 with the Ordinul "Meritul Sportiv" – (The Medal "The Sportive Merit") class III.

International goals
Scores and results list Romania's goal tally first, score column indicates score after each Gabor goal.

Honours
Corvinul Hunedoara
Divizia B: 1979–80

References

External links 

 Romania National Team 1980–1989 - Details

1961 births
Living people
Romanian footballers
Romania international footballers
Romania youth international footballers
CS Corvinul Hunedoara players
FC Universitatea Cluj players
CSM Unirea Alba Iulia players
Diósgyőri VTK players
UEFA Euro 1984 players
Liga I players
Liga II players
Nemzeti Bajnokság I players
Romanian expatriate footballers
Expatriate footballers in Hungary
Romanian expatriate sportspeople in Hungary
Romanian football managers
CS Corvinul Hunedoara managers
CSM Deva managers
Association football forwards
People from Hunedoara County